Maxime de Zeeuw (born April 26, 1987) is a Belgian professional basketball player for Limburg United of the BNXT League. De Zeeuw usually plays at the power forward position. He has also been a member of the Belgian national basketball team, whom he played with at the European championships of 2011, 2013, 2015, and 2017.

Professional career
During the 2013-2014 EuroChallenge campaign with his team Antwerp Giants, De Zeeuw was awarded the title of European Player of the Year and Best Defensive Player of the Year by Eurobasket.com.

De Zeeuw had an impressive 2013–14 season , in which he was named Belgian Player of the Year.

For the 2014–15 season, De Zeeuw signed a contract with Acea Roma of the Italian LBA. 

For the 2015–16 season, De Zeeuw signed with the Czech team ČEZ Nymburk of EuroCup.

On June 29, 2016, De Zeeuw signed with EWE Baskets Oldenburg of the Basketball Bundesliga.

On July 16, 2018, De Zeeuw signed a two-year deal with Monbus Obradoiro of the Liga ACB. He averaged 3.4 points and 2.0 rebounds per game in the 2019-20 season. 

On September 19, 2020, De Zeeuw signed with Stelmet Zielona Góra of the PLK and the VTB United League. On September 28, 2020, without playing a single game, his contract has been terminated by mutual agreement.

On November 23, 2020, he has signed with Hapoel Holon of the Israeli Basketball Premier League.

On January 27, 2022, De Zeeuw signed with New Basket Brindisi of the Lega Basket Serie A.

On July 1, 2022, he has signed with Limburg United of the BNXT League.

International career
He represented Belgium at the EuroBasket 2015 where they lost to Greece in eighth finals with 75–54.

References

External links
Eurobasket.com profile

1987 births
Living people
Antwerp Giants players
Basketball Nymburk players
Belgian expatriate basketball people in Germany
Belgian expatriate basketball people in Italy
Belgian expatriate basketball people in Spain
Belgian men's basketball players
Belgium national basketball players
Brussels Basketball players
EWE Baskets Oldenburg players
Gent Hawks players
Lega Basket Serie A players
Liga ACB players
Limburg United players
New Basket Brindisi players
Obradoiro CAB players
Pallacanestro Virtus Roma players
People from Uccle
Power forwards (basketball)
RBC Pepinster players
Sportspeople from Brussels